A constitutional referendum was held in French Somaliland on 21 October 1945 as part of the wider French constitutional referendum. 

Both referendum questions were approved by large margins. Voter turnout was 73.4%.

Results

Question I

Question II

References

1945 referendums
1945
1945 in French Somaliland
Constitutional referendums in France
October 1945 events in Africa